Benjamin Arthur Gilman (December 6, 1922 – December 17, 2016) was an American politician and Republican member of the United States House of Representatives from Middletown, New York, from January 3, 1973, to January 3, 2003.

Early life
Gilman was born in Poughkeepsie, New York, the son of Esther (Gold) and Harry Gilman. His parents were Austrian Jewish immigrants. Gilman graduated from Middletown High School in Middletown, New York, in 1941 and received a B.S. from the Wharton School of Business at the University of Pennsylvania in 1946. He also earned an LL.B. from New York Law School. Gilman served in the United States Army Air Corps from 1942 until 1945 during World War II. During that conflict, he flew 35 missions over Japan, earning the Distinguished Flying Cross and the Air Medal with Oak Leaf Clusters.

Early career
After graduating New York Law School in 1950, Gilman served as assistant attorney general to the Attorney General of New York from 1953 until 1955. Following this, he practiced law privately in his hometown of Middletown, New York.

Gilman was a member of the New York State Assembly from 1967 to 1972, sitting in the 177th, 178th and 179th New York State Legislatures. He was a member of the New York State Southeastern Water Commission.

Tenure

Gilman first won election to Congress in 1972 to represent New York's 26th congressional district. New York's congressional districts had been redrawn in reapportionment, and in the general election Gilman defeated incumbent congressman John G. Dow, a Democrat who had been serving in New York's 27th congressional district, (which included most of the territory and population of the new 26th district). Gilman subsequently served in Congress from January 3, 1973, until January 3, 2003. During his time in Congress, he was chair of the House Committee on International Relations (104th through 106th Congresses).

He was widely regarded as a moderate Republican in the mold of New York's Nelson Rockefeller He was active on foreign affairs issues, serving as a Congressional delegate to the United Nations, serving under Ambassador Jeane Kirkpatrick in 1981. He was a Member of the Ukraine Famine Commission, a member of the U.S., European, Canadian and Mexican Interparliamentary conferences, and a Congressional Advisor to the U.N. Law of the Sea Conference. He was co-chair of the Committee on Irish Affairs and participated on the International Task Force on Narcotics. He was a recipient of the Secretary's Distinguished Service Award, a gold medal and certificate which represents the highest civilian honor bestowed by the State Department.

Throughout his years in Congress, he was a member of the House Post Office and Civil Service Committee, the name of which evolved into the Government Reform and Oversight Committee in the 1990s. As a co-founder of the House Select Committee on Narcotics, he served as a senior member on that Committee (1977–1989) and continued to serve as a member until the committee was abolished in 1993.

During the 1970s, Gilman became closely identified with the issue of Prisoners of War and Missing in Action in Southeast Asia. He served on the Select Congressional Committee on that problem, and was one of only two Members of Congress to vote in opposition to closing the book on the POW/MIA situation.

He also became involved with World hunger in the 1970s, authoring the legislation creating a presidential Commission Against Hunger, to which he was subsequently appointed by President Jimmy Carter.

As the chair of the House Committee on Foreign Affairs, from 1995 to 2002, Congressman Gilman consistently advocated stronger ties with India
, as a counterweight against Chinese influence in the region, particularly in Pakistan. During the Kargil War against Pakistan, he urged American lawmakers to pressure the Pakistani government to withdraw from the conflict, stating that he held Pakistan solely responsible for the conflict. During a Hearing on the Status of Negotiations between China and Tibet in April 2000, Congressman Gilman said, “The Tibetan cause enjoys the global support that it does because it is a courageous attempt by a Nation and a people who are trying to regain what is rightfully theirs by throwing off the repression of colonization. It is in the interest of international stability to have Tibet once again serve as it had for 2000 years as a buffer zone strategically placed between India and China.” In recognition of his contribution to furthering U.S. ties with India, he was awarded that country's second highest civilian honor, the Padma Vibhushan, in 2001. He is one of only 12 foreigners, and one of only 3 Americans not of Indian origin, to have received the award. In his later years in Congress, Gilman was a vociferous and frequent critic of President Bill Clinton, particularly on matters related to American foreign policy.

Congressman Gilman helped gain passage of the International Academic Opportunity Act of 2000, establishing exchange programs for American students to study abroad. Named after Gilman is the Benjamin A. Gilman International Scholarship, a program for Pell Grant eligible American college students to study or intern abroad administered by the United States Department of State.

Congressman Gilman retired from Congress in 2003 after New York's 20th congressional district, which he had represented, was broken up and dispersed among the 17th, 18th, 19th and 22nd Congressional Districts in the redistricting that followed the 2000 census and reapportionment. At the time of his retirement, Gilman was the oldest sitting representative in the U.S. House (in all of Congress, only Senators Strom Thurmond and Robert Byrd were older). He was the senior Republican representing New York, and the second-most senior Member from New York overall behind only Charles B. Rangel. In 2003, following his retirement from Congress, the Dalai Lama bestowed upon Congressman Gilman the International Campaign for Tibet's Light of Truth Award.

On March 28, 2008, Gilman participated in the ribbon cutting ceremony for the Gilman Center for International Education in his hometown of Middletown, New York, on the campus of SUNY Orange, also known as Orange County Community College. This modern new facility for international studies is expected to attract students from throughout the world, and houses Gilman's public papers from throughout his 36 years in elective office. Various photographs and memorabilia from throughout his career are on display.

On Jun 14, 2011, Gilman was awarded the Top Honor Prize, and recognized by the World Peace Prize Awarding Council for being a lifelong champion of human rights: fighting world hunger, narcotic abuse and trafficking.

Personal life
Gilman was married three times: to the former Jane Prizant (1927–2000), a lawyer and daughter of a well-known actor of the Yiddish theater (Hyman Prizant), to Rita Kelhofer, and to Georgia Tingus. His children (from the first marriage) were Jonathan Gilman, Susan Gilman-Harts, Harrison Gilman, David Gilman (deceased) and Ellen Gilman (deceased). Subsequent to his retirement, he continued to live in Middletown, his home in the Hudson Valley district that he represented.

Death
Gilman died on December 17, 2016, at the Castle Point Veteran's Hospital in Fishkill (town), New York from surgical complications, eleven days after his 94th birthday. He was survived by his third wife, Georgia, by three of his five children: sons Jonathan and Harrison, and daughter Susan.  He is also survived by a stepdaughter, Nicole Pappas, and a stepson, Peter Tingus.  He was survived by eleven grandchildren.  A daughter, Ellen, and a son, David, both predeceased him.

See also

 List of Jewish members of the United States Congress

References

External links

 

1922 births
2016 deaths
Jewish American military personnel
Republican Party members of the New York State Assembly
Wharton School of the University of Pennsylvania alumni
New York Law School alumni
Jewish members of the United States House of Representatives
Politicians from Orange County, New York
Recipients of the Padma Vibhushan in public affairs
United States Army Air Forces pilots of World War II
Recipients of the Distinguished Flying Cross (United States)
Recipients of the Air Medal
Military personnel from New York (state)
People from Middletown, Orange County, New York
Republican Party members of the United States House of Representatives from New York (state)
21st-century American politicians
21st-century American Jews
Members of Congress who became lobbyists